Worlington may refer to:
Worlington, Devon, village in Devon, England.
Worlington, Suffolk, village in Suffolk, England

See also
East Worlington, village in Devon, England
West Worlington, village in Devon, England